Marxisterna was a local political party in Ludvika, Sweden, that based its policies largely on the works of Karl Marx.The group was formed in 1990. When the party congress of Vänsterpartiet Kommunisterna (Left Party - Communists) decided to change its name to Vänsterpartiet, a group of delegates from Ludvika left in protest. They later formed Marxisterna as a local political party. The group contested local elections unsuccessfully. It was later disbanded.

Political parties established in 1990
Defunct communist parties in Sweden
1990 establishments in Sweden